USS Wachusetts (SP-548) was an armed motorboat that served in the United States Navy as a patrol vessel from 1917 to 1919. She was renamed SP-548 during her period of service. In 1919 she was transferred to the United States Bureau of Fisheries and renamed USFS Fulmar, and operated as a fisheries science research vessel on the Great Lakes until 1933 or 1934, when she was transferred to the Ohio Division of Conservation.

Construction and early history
 
Wachusetts was built as the private motorboat W.C.T.U. in 1916 by W. A. and S. D. Moss of Friendship, Maine. She was powered by a  Neisco diesel engine and carried  of fuel. She soon was renamed Wachusetts.

U.S. Navy service
The U.S. Navy purchased Wachusetts for US$18,000 from the Howard Lumber Company of Boston, Massachusetts, for World War I service as a patrol boat in the section patrol.  The Navy took possession of her on 26 April 1917 and commissioned her as USS Wachusetts (SP-548). The Dictionary of American Naval Fighting Ships gives her crew in Navy service as six, but U.S. Navy Bureau of Construction and Repair data show a crew of two officers and fifteen men.

Little is known of her U.S. Navy activities because her deck logs have been lost. As of 1 February 1918, Wachusetts was operating out of the section base at Boothbay, Maine, probably on local patrol duties, under the aegis of Commandant, 1st Naval District. Her commanding officer as of that time was Ensign J. B. Eckroll, USNRF.

Sometime after the conclusion of World War I, SP-548 was decommissioned, and she was struck from the Navy List on 25 October 1919.

U.S. Bureau of Fisheries service
By authority of an Executive Order of 24 May 1919, the U.S. Navy transferred three former section patrol boats – SP-548, and  – to the United States Bureau of Fisheries (BOF) for service as fishery patrol vessels in the Territory of Alaska. The vessels were turned over to the BOF at Quincy, Massachusetts, and towed to Woods Hole, Massachusetts, by the BOF steamer . Phalarope then towed Cobra, renamed USFS Petrel, and Calypso, renamed USFS Merganser, to Norfolk, Virginia, for transport to the Pacific Northwest aboard the collier , but SP-548, renamed USFS Fulmar, remained at the BOF's Woods Hole station for later shipment.

After Fulmar arrived at Woods Hole, the BOF changed its plans for her. Instead of the originally planned Alaskan patrol service, the BOF decided to base her at Charlevoix, Michigan, and assign her to fish culture operations on Lake Michigan. During July, September, and October 1921, Phalarope′s crew modified Fulmar at Woods Hole for use as a fisheries science research vessel, including installation of a deckhouse from bow to pilothouse; and supported her transfer to Charlevoix.

Stationed at Charlevoix as the first research vessel at the BOF station there – which eventually became the United States Geological Survey′s Great Lakes Science Center – Fulmar was assigned initially to studying the prevention of the destruction of undersized and immature fish by commercial gillnetting. She conducted the first experimental fishing survey in Lake Michigan from 1930 through 1932 using linen gill nets.

During fiscal year 1934 (which ran from July 1, 1933 to June 30, 1934) the BOF turned Fulmar over to the State of Ohio.

Ohio Division of Conservation
The State of Ohio placed Fulmar in service with the Ohio Division of Conservation, stationing her at Put in Bay station in Ohio on Lake Erie. Her later history is unavailable.

References

External links
 SP-548, ex-Wachusetts (SP 548) NavSource Online: Civilian Vessel Photo Archive
 U.S. Bureau of Fisheries R/V Fulmar on a scientific cruise (ca. 1931)

Ships built in Maine
1916 ships
World War I patrol vessels of the United States
Ships of the United States Bureau of Fisheries
Ships transferred from the United States Navy to the United States Bureau of Fisheries